Sven von Storch (born 23 December 1970) is a Chilean-German businessman and digital activist who collaborates with conservatives leaders like Jair Bolsonaro and José Antonio Kast. Similarly, he is an admirer of Steve Bannon.

His Chilean older brother Klaus is an aerospace engineer.

According to the scholar Alexander Häusler, he and his wife Beatrix are responsible of a network campaign in favour of Alternative für Deutschland (AfD). The positions promoted by these media are conservative and consist of issues such as euroscepticism, anti-globalism, anti-communism, criticism of gender studies and sexual education, opposition to same-sex marriage, opposition to immigration, among others.

Biography

Family background
Sven von Storch's father moved to Chile once finished the Second World War and after the expropriation of his large estate in Parchow by the Soviet occupation forces in Mecklenburg, Rostock district. Then he built up a new life as agricultural entrepreneur in the South American country, where he met his wife, who also was of German descent.

Early life
Sven grew up as one of his parents' four sons in Chile and received his school education there.

After graduating from high school, in 1988, Sven went to Germany to study a BA in business administration and thus live in Germany ever since. After the reunification, his brother Thomas achieved the recovery of their grandparents' estate from the state; Thomas died in an airplane accident in 2004.

References

External links
 

1970 births
Living people
Chilean people of German descent
German people of Chilean descent
Chilean anti-communists
Alternative for Germany politicians
Far-right politics in Chile
Far-right politics in Germany